Shivaji IV(1816 - January 03, 1822) was Raja of Kolhapur of the Bhonsle dynasty. He ruled from July 02, 1821 to Jan 03, 1822. He was succeeded by Shahaji of Kolhapur.

Sources

Maharajas of Kolhapur
1816 births
1822 deaths